Archie Robert Henderson (born February 17, 1957) is a Canadian retired ice hockey player. He played 23 games in the National Hockey League for the Washington Capitals, Minnesota North Stars, and Hartford Whalers between 1980 and 1982. The rest of his career, which lasted from 1977 to 1988, was spent in different minor leagues. He was selected by the Capitals in the 1977 NHL Entry Draft. He is the older brother of Don Henderson. Standing 6' 6", Henderson was one of the tallest NHL players of his time, at a time when players over 6' 4" were a rarity.

Henderson is most noted as a player for his time with the Port Huron Flags when he got a broken nose, eight stitches to the forehead and a slight concussion from the Dayton Owls' Willie Trognitz at the conclusion of a match-ending, bench-clearing brawl at the McMorran Place ice arena on October 29, 1977. The result was Trognitz being banned for life by the International Hockey League (IHL) five days later on November 3.

Henderson is currently the Director of Pro Scouting with the Edmonton Oilers.

Career statistics

Regular season and playoffs

References

External links

Profile at hockeydraftcentral.com

1957 births
Living people
Binghamton Whalers players
Calgary Canucks players
Canadian ice hockey right wingers
Canadian ice hockey coaches
Detroit Red Wings scouts
Fort Worth Texans players
Hartford Whalers players
Hershey Bears players
Lethbridge Broncos players
Maine Mariners players
Minnesota North Stars players
Nashville South Stars players
New Haven Nighthawks players
Nova Scotia Oilers players
Port Huron Flags players
Saginaw Hawks players
Ice hockey people from Calgary
Victoria Cougars (WHL) coaches
Victoria Cougars (WHL) players
Washington Capitals draft picks
Washington Capitals players
Washington Capitals scouts